Scopula cervinata  is a moth of the family Geometridae. It was described by Warren in 1905. It is endemic to Sierra Leone.

References

Moths described in 1905
cervinata
Moths of Africa
Endemic fauna of Sierra Leone
Taxa named by William Warren (entomologist)